During the 1999–2000 season, Sunderland participated in the FA Premier League.

Season summary
Sunderland's 1999–2000 season started at Stamford Bridge, where Chelsea beat them 4–0. However, in the return match later in the season Sunderland turned the tables on Chelsea, avenging their 4–0 defeat with a 4–1 win at the Stadium of Light.  Sunderland also achieved a 2–1 victory over rivals Newcastle United at St. James' Park,  a result which helped bring about the resignation of Newcastle's manager, Ruud Gullit. At the end of the season Sunderland finished seventh, with Kevin Phillips winning the European Golden Shoe in his first top-flight season, scoring 30 goals.

Team kit and sponsors
This season was the first in which the club was sponsored by car dealership Reg Vardy, and the last in which ASICS made the club's kit.

Results
Sunderland's score comes first

Legend

FA Premier League

League table

Results summary

Results by round

FA Cup

League Cup

Players

First-team squad
Squad at end of season

Left club during the season

Reserve squad

Transfers

In

Out

Transfers in:  £9,620,000
Transfers out:  £8,200,000
Total spending:  £1,420,000

Statistics

Appearances and goals

|-
|colspan="14"|Players no longer with club:

|-
|}

Notes

References

Sunderland A.F.C. seasons
Sunderland